Eric M. Bazilian (born July 21, 1953) is an American singer, songwriter, multi-instrumentalist, arranger and producer. Bazilian is a founding member of the rock band The Hooters. He wrote "One of Us", a song first recorded by Joan Osborne in 1995.

Early life
Eric Bazilian was born on July 21, 1953 at the Hospital of the University of Pennsylvania in Philadelphia to Stanford Bazilian, a psychiatrist, and Barbara Bazilian, a concert pianist. He is Jewish. Bazilian graduated from
Germantown Friends School and studied physics at the University of Pennsylvania.

Career

The Hooters
In college, Bazilian met Rob Hyman. Together, they formed The Hooters in 1980. Bazilian sings and plays guitar, mandolin, recorder, harmonica, and saxophone in the band.

In 1983, The Hooters began working on their first album. The result, Amore, was released on the independent label Antenna and sold over 100,000 copies.

The band's second album, Nervous Night (1985), featured the singles “And We Danced”, “Day by Day”, and “All You Zombies”. The album went platinum and sold more than two million copies in the United States.

The Hooters first gained major commercial success in the United States in the mid-1980s due to heavy radio airplay and MTV rotation of several songs, including "All You Zombies", "Day by Day", "And We Danced" and "Where Do the Children Go". The band played at the Live Aid benefit concert in Philadelphia in 1985. In Europe, the Hooters had success with the singles "All You Zombies" and "Johnny B", but the band's breakthrough across Europe came with the single "Satellite". The band played at The Wall Concert in Berlin in 1990.

On May 11, 2004, The Hooters were presented with a Lifetime Achievement Award from the Philadelphia Music Awards.

Other work
In 1995, Bazilian produced and arranged Joan Osborne's major-label debut album Relish. The album was nominated for six Grammy Awards, including Song of the Year for the No. 4 Billboard hit "One of Us," which Bazilian wrote.

Accolades
On November 17, 2000, Bazilian was inducted into the Philadelphia Walk of Fame on the Avenue of the Arts.

On April 21, 2004, Bazilian won an ASCAP Film and Television Music Award for "One of Us" as the theme song for the CBS television series Joan of Arcadia.

Discography

Solo career
 The Optimist (2000)
 A Very Dull Boy (2002)
 What Shall Become of the Baby? (2012) (with Mats Wester, as Bazilian & Wester)
 Bazilian (2021)

References

External links

Eric Bazilian official website

Living people
1953 births
American rock singers
American rock guitarists
American male guitarists
American male singer-songwriters
The Hooters members
Singer-songwriters from Pennsylvania
Guitarists from Philadelphia
University of Pennsylvania School of Arts and Sciences alumni
Germantown Friends School alumni
20th-century American guitarists
20th-century American male musicians
21st-century American guitarists
21st-century American male singers
21st-century American singers